Normann is a surname. Notable people with the surname include:

Adelsteen Normann (1848–1918), Norwegian painter
Axel Otto Normann (1884–1962), Norwegian journalist, newspaper editor, theatre critic and theatre director
Emil Normann (1798–1881), Danish painter and naval officer
Jeppe Normann (born 1951), Norwegian fencer
Kristin Normann (born 1954), Norwegian judge and legal scholar
Mathias Normann (born 1996), Norwegian footballer
Richard Normann (1943–2003), Swedish management consultant
Runar Normann (born 1978), Norwegian footballer
Sigurd Johan Normann (1879–1939), Norwegian theologian and Lutheran bishop
Wilhelm Normann (1870–1939), German chemist

See also
Normann Stadler (born 1973), German triathlete
Mount Normann, mountain of South Georgia
Normann Palace, building in Osijek, Croatia
Norman (name)

Ethnonymic surnames